The personification of Russia is traditionally feminine and most commonly maternal since medieval times.

Most common terms for national personification of Russia are:
Mother Russia (tr. Matushka Rossiya, "Mother Russia"; also, tr. Rossiya-matushka, "Russia the Mother", tr. Mat'-Rossiya, tr. Matushka Rus' , "Mother Rus' "),
Homeland the Mother (tr. Rodina-mat' ).

In the Russian language, the concept of motherland is rendered by two terms: "" (tr. rodina), literally, "place of birth" and "" (tr. otchizna), literally "fatherland". 
 
Harald Haarmann and Orlando Figes see the goddess  Mokosh a source of the "Mother Russia" concept.

Usage

After the October Revolution and during the Russian Civil War, the image was employed by some anti-Bolshevik forces seeking to restore pre-revolutionary Russia.

During the Soviet period, the Bolsheviks extensively utilized the image of "Motherland", especially during World War II.

Statues

During the Soviet era, many statues of Motherland or Mother Russia were built, most to commemorate the Great Patriotic War. These include:
The Motherland Calls (tr. Rodina-mat' zovot) a colossal statue in Volgograd, Russia, commemorating the Battle of Stalingrad
Mother Motherland, Kyiv (tr. Batʹkivshchyna-Maty, "Mother Fatherland") or, and more commonly referred to as, Rodina-Mat (tr. Rodina-mat' ) is a monumental statue that is a part of the Museum of The History of Ukraine in World War II
Mother Motherland (Saint Petersburg), a statue at the Piskarevskoye Memorial Cemetery, St. Petersburg, Russia
Mother Russia (Kaliningrad), a monument in Kaliningrad, Russia
Mother Motherland Mourning over Her Perished Sons (tr. Rodina-mat', skorbyashchaya o pogibshikh synov'yakh), Minsk, Belarus commemorating the dead in Afghanistan
Mother Motherland (Naberezhnye Chelny), a monument in Naberezhnye Chelny, Russia
Mother Motherland (Pavlovsk), a memorial complex, Pavlovsk, Russia
Motherland Monument (Matveev Kurgan)

See also

 Defender of the Fatherland Day
 Mat Zemlya
 Russian Bear

References

Further reading
 Ellen Rutten, Unattainable Bride Russia: Gendering Nation, State, and Intelligentsia in Russian Intellectual Culture, 2010, .

External links
 

Russia
National symbols of Russia